Ubeidiya commonly refers to:
 Ubeidiya prehistoric site
 Ubeidiya, West Bank
 Ubeidiya, Tiberias

See also
 Abd (Arabic), the root (abd) of the word family to which 'ubeidiya belongs, with links to other derivates